Errard is a surname. Notable people with the surname include:

 Charles Errard (1606–1689), French painter, architect and engraver
 François Errard (born 1967), French tennis player

See also
 Erhard
 Sault Falls, also known as Errard Falls

French-language surnames